Zhou Chaochen (born 1 November 1937) is a Chinese computer scientist.

Zhou was born in Nanhui, Shanghai, China. He studied as an undergraduate at the Department of Mathematics and Mechanics, Peking University (1954–1958) and as a postgraduate at the Institute of Computing Technology, Chinese Academy of Sciences (CAS) (1963–1967).

He worked at Peking University and CAS until his visit to the Oxford University Computing Laboratory (now the Oxford University Department of Computer Science) (1989–1992). During this time, he was the prime investigator of the duration calculus, an interval logic for real-time systems as part of the European ESPRIT ProCoS project on Provably Correct Systems.

During the periods 1990–1992 and 1995–1996, Zhou Chaochen was visiting professor at the Department of Computer Science, Technical University of Denmark, Lyngby, on the invitation of Professor Dines Bjørner. He was Principal Research Fellow (1992–1997) and later Director of UNU-IIST in Macau (1997–2002), until his retirement, when he returned to Beijing.

In 2007, Zhou and Dines Bjørner, the first Director of UNU-IIST, were honoured on the occasion of their 70th birthdays. Zhou is a member of the Chinese Academy of Sciences.

Books
 Zhou, Chaochen and Hansen, Michael R., Duration Calculus: A Formal Approach to Real-Time Systems. Springer-Verlag, Monographs in Theoretical Computer Science, An EATCS Series, 2003. .

References

External links
 Institute of Software, Chinese Academy of Sciences (ISCAS) information
 

1937 births
Living people
Chinese computer scientists
Formal methods people
Members of the Chinese Academy of Sciences
Members of the Department of Computer Science, University of Oxford
Peking University alumni
Academic staff of Peking University
Scientists from Shanghai
Academic staff of the Technical University of Denmark
Academic staff of United Nations University